In 1969, the United States FBI, under Director J. Edgar Hoover, continued for a twentieth year to maintain a public list of the people it regarded as the Ten Most Wanted Fugitives.

The FBI began the year 1969 with few multi-year long-timers on the list, and many Fugitives from the prior year who were soon captured in the early half of the year:

 1965 #203 (four years), John William Clouser remained still at large
 1967 #246 (two years), Gordon Dale Ervin arrested June 7, 1969
 1968 #265 (one year), Charles Lee Herron remained still at large
 1968 #273 (one year), George Edward Wells arrested May 27, 1969
 1968 #279 (one year), Taylor Morris Teaford remained still at large
 1968 #282 (one year), Byron James Rice remained still at large
 1968 #287 (four months), Harold James Evans arrested January 2, 1969
 1968 #290 (five months), Richard Lee Tingler arrested May 19, 1969
 1968 #293 (three months), Ruth Eisemann Schier arrested March 5, 1969

But there were few new fugitives added in 1969 to replace those names, as the string of many years of good luck had run out for the FBI in quickly capturing its most wanted.  In all total for 1969, the FBI only added eleven new fugitives that year, the least number since 1959.

1969 fugitives
The "Ten Most Wanted Fugitives" listed by the FBI in 1969 include (in FBI list appearance sequence order):

Baltazar Garcia Estolas
January 3, 1969 #294
Eight months on the list
Baltazar Garcia Estolas – U.S. prisoner arrested September 3, 1969 in Langtry, Texas after a citizen recognized him from television publicity.

Billie Austin Bryant
January 8, 1969 #295 
Shortest time (excluding never published) on the list, 2 hours
Fourth "Special Addition"
Billie Austin Bryant – US PRISONER at the Federal Penitentiary at Atlanta, Georgia November 4, 1969; was sentenced to two consecutive life terms November 3, 1969, with no possibility of parole, at the end of his prior 18 to 54-year sentence; was found guilty of Two counts of first degree murder in United States District Court for the District of Columbia, Washington, D.C., on October 27, 1969; sentenced to serve 20 additional years for conviction April 14, 1969 in Maryland State Court of the armed robbery of the Citizens Bank and Trust Company of Maryland, Fort Washington Branch; convicted in United States District Court for the Eastern District of Virginia, at Alexandria, Virginia on April 10, 1969, of being an escaped federal prisoner and was sentenced to serve three additional years; indicted March 5, 1970 by a federal grand jury, in Washington, D.C., on two counts of killing a federal officer, and two counts of first degree murder; was arrested January 8, 1969 by MPDC officer Jan David Kopacz.who found Bryant hiding in an attic on Mississippi Avenue, S.E., Washington, D.C. Bryant was taken to MPDC Homicide Division and signed a statement admitting the shooting of the two FBI agents, but added that it was in self-defense; was added to the Top 10 list for the shortest time of any fugitive, for only 2 hours; had made his escape down a tree adjoining the rear of his wife's apartment, after he fatally shot two FBI agents point blank, when they knocked on the door in Southeast Washington, D.C.; was identified as a prior customer by two of the victim tellers of the Citizens Bank and Trust Company of Maryland, Fort Washington Branch, which he robbed on January 8, 1969 and then escaped in a maroon Cadillac; was indicted September 9, 1968 by a federal grand jury, in the Eastern District of Virginia in Norfolk, Virginia as an escaped federal prisoner; had escaped August 23, 1968, from the District of Columbia Department of Corrections Reformatory at Lorton, Virginia, by crashing an automobile (under his repair) through a chain link gate;  was sentenced on April 5, 1968, to serve 18 to 54 years upon conviction in the U.S. District Court, Washington, D.C., for bank robbery and assault, in approximately six Washington, D.C., area bank robberies
 Billie Austin Bryant profile at FBI Famous Cases page, May 2006

Billy Len Schales
January 27, 1969 #296
Three days on the list
Billy Len Schales – U.S. prisoner arrested January 30, 1969 in Bossier City, Louisiana after a citizen recognized him
from a newspaper article in the Shreveport Times.

Thomas James Lucas
February 13, 1969 #297
Two weeks on the list
Thomas James Lucas – U.S. prisoner arrested February 26, 1969 in Washington, D. C. after a citizen recognized him from a wanted flyer.

Warren David Reddock
March 11, 1969 #298
Two years on the list
Warren David Reddock – U.S. prisoner arrested April 14, 1971 in Pacifica, California after a citizen recognized him
from a magazine article.

George Edward Blue
March 20, 1969 #299
One week on the list
George Edward Blue – U.S. prisoner arrested March 28, 1969 in Chicago, Illinois.

Cameron David Bishop
April 15, 1969 #300
Six years on the list
Cameron David Bishop – U.S. prisoner arrested March 12, 1975 in East Greenwich, Rhode Island when local police received an anonymous phone call advising them to be on the lookout for four armed men in a car near a bank. Two days later police located the car and arrested the men, including Bishop among them, after six years as a fugitive.

Marie Dean Arrington
May 29, 1969 #301
Two years on the list
Marie Dean Arrington – U.S. prisoner arrested December 22, 1971 in New Orleans, Louisiana.

Benjamin Hoskins Paddock
June 10, 1969 #302
Eight years on the list
Benjamin Hoskins Paddock – Removed from the list on May 5, 1977 because he no longer fit the criteria. He was captured in 1978. His son Stephen Craig Paddock committed the 2017 Las Vegas shooting.

Francis Leroy Hohimer
June 20, 1969 #303
Six months on the list
Francis Leroy Hohimer – US PRISONER arrested December 20, 1969 in Greenwich, Connecticut through citizen cooperation.

Joseph Lloyd Thomas
September 12, 1969 #304
Six months on the list
Joseph Lloyd Thomas – U.S. prisoner arrested March 8, 1970 in Peoria, Illinois;  second appearance on the list, was also Fugitive #123 arrested December 16, 1959 in Pelzer, South Carolina

See also

Later entries
FBI Ten Most Wanted Fugitives, 2020s
FBI Ten Most Wanted Fugitives, 2010s
FBI Ten Most Wanted Fugitives, 2000s
FBI Ten Most Wanted Fugitives, 1990s
FBI Ten Most Wanted Fugitives, 1980s
FBI Ten Most Wanted Fugitives, 1970s
FBI Ten Most Wanted Fugitives, 1960s

Prior entries
FBI Ten Most Wanted Fugitives, 1950s

References

External links
Current FBI top ten most wanted fugitives at FBI site
FBI pdf source document listing all Ten Most Wanted year by year (removed by FBI)

 
1969 in the United States